is a subway station located in the Monzen-nakachō district of Kōtō, Tokyo. The station opened on September 14, 1967.

Lines
 Tokyo Metro Tozai Line (T-12)
 Toei Oedo Line (E-15)

Platforms

Tokyo Metro

Toei

History
The Tozai Line platforms opened on 14 September 1967 while the Oedo Line platforms opened on 12 December 2000.

The station facilities of the Tozai Line were inherited by Tokyo Metro after the privatization of the Teito Rapid Transit Authority (TRTA) in 2004.

See also

 List of railway stations in Japan

References

External links

 Tokyo Metro Monzen-nakacho Station
 Toei Monzen-nakacho Station

Railway stations in Tokyo
Railway stations in Japan opened in 1967
Tokyo Metro Tozai Line